Longburgh is a hamlet in the civil parish of Burgh by Sands, in the City of Carlisle District, in the English county of Cumbria. Nearby settlements include the village of Burgh by Sands and the hamlet of Dykesfield. In 1870-72 the township had a population of 146.

See also

Listed buildings in Burgh by Sands

References 

Hamlets in Cumbria
Burgh by Sands